Romans in Britain may refer to:

 Roman conquest of Britain
 Roman Britain, the Roman Empire's governorship of part of Great Britain
 The Romans in Britain, a controversial 1980 stage play